Thomas Roberts (27 April 1880 – 13 July 1976) was a Barbadian cricketer. He played in four first-class matches for the Barbados cricket team in 1896/97 and 1897/98.

See also
 List of Barbadian representative cricketers

References

External links
 

1880 births
1976 deaths
Barbadian cricketers
Barbados cricketers
People from Saint Michael, Barbados